The 2010–11 season was French football club Paris Saint-Germain's 38th professional season, their 38th season in Ligue 1 and their 37th consecutive season in French top-flight. PSG was coached by Antoine Kombouaré. The club was presided by Robin Leproux. PSG was present in the Ligue 1, the Coupe de France, the Coupe de la Ligue and the UEFA Europa League. PSG's average home gate was 29,317, the fourth highest in Ligue 1.

After a season marked by the violence between the fans and poor results from the team, Paris Saint-Germain started the season with the prospect of regaining success and stability. The club management presented the key measures of the anti-violence which intended to pacify the Parc des Princes. By the name "Tous PSG", many celebrities, such as former player Nicolas Anelka, attended and committed to the call of the club on the occasion of its 40 years. Paris Saint-Germain maintained the services of key players such as Claude Makélélé, Guillaume Hoarau, Stéphane Sessègnon and Mevlüt Erdinç, as well as adding Mathieu Bodmer and Nenê to their player pool. Robin Leproux had pretty high ambitions and declared that PSG was on the course to become more competitive. He expected the capital club to finish between the first four in the league and to pull something off in the Europa League:

News
Robin Leproux announced the main measures of "Tous PSG", an anti-violence plan to pacify the Parc des Princes: removal of subscriptions, random distribution of seats and fully supervision by the club over the fans. It was a powerful measure by the club which intended to finally turn a page in their history, often punctuated by serious incidents due to the increasing antagonism between supporters of Auteuil and Boulogne. Assistant coach Yves Bertucci and physical trainer Raphaël Fèvre were handed a one-year extension. Goalkeeping coach Nicolas Dehon left for Marseille and Gilles Bourges replaced him. Claude Makélélé postponed plans to retire and instead signed a new one-year contract extension with PSG. The friendly match between PSG and Mechelen took place behind closed doors at the Camp des Loges. The towns of Arras and Le Touquet refused to host the friendly match due to the people's fear towards PSG fans.

Paris Saint-Germain were plunged into controversy following forgery allegations against goalkeeper Apoula Edel. Sevilla lodged a formal complaint to UEFA after former Cameroon coach Nicolas Philibert declared that 24-year-old Apoula Edel was instead a 29-year-old named Ambroise Beyama. If the allegations were proved true and the player was found guilty, he could be sentenced to prison. Meanwhile, if false documents were lodged with the game's French and European governing bodies, Paris Saint-Germain risked losing their last two wins against Sevilla and Arles-Avignon. They could also face expulsion from the European competition, demotion from the top tier of French football and heavy fines. Paris Saint-Germain, in partnership with Goom Radio, officially launched their own numerical radio station, the first ever dedicated to a Ligue 1 football club, which is also available over the internet. Paris Saint-Germain goalkeeper Apoula Edel was acquitted of possessing fake documents by the French police as his passport was found to be genuine. As a result, UEFA rejected Sevilla's appeal to have their Europa League defeat to Paris Saint-Germain overturned.

The LFP decided to close the visiting stand to followers at the Ligue 1 matches between Paris Saint-Germain and Marseille. The measure was designed to ensure the security after the serious incidents of recent seasons. Clément Chantôme was named Player of the Month for November by the UNFP with 51% of the votes. Nenê and Robin Leproux were respectively elected Foreign Player of the Year and President of the Year by France Football. The second phase of "Tous PSG" was implemented. Free subscriptions returned but the random distribution of seats was maintained. The new measures also allowed the creation of supporter associations signatories to the "Charte 12" peace treaty. Antoine Kombouaré was elected Manager of the Year by France 3. Nenê was named Player of the Month for December by the UNFP with 62% of the votes. The LFP sanctioned Paris Saint-Germain and AS Monaco following the use of a match ball which was not the "snow" version of the official Ligue 1 ball. Mamadou Sakho extended his contract with PSG until 2014. Clément Chantôme extended his current deal with the club until 2015. Christophe Jallet inked a contract extension until 2015. Antoine Kombouaré penned a contract extension that saw him link to the Parc des Princes club for a further 12 months.

Mamadou Sakho was named "Player of the Month" for April by the UNFP with 45% of the votes. Mamadou Sakho confirmed his continuing ascendancy in the French game by collecting the coveted Ligue 1 Young Player of the Year award. Sakho and Nenê appeared in the Ligue 1 All-star XI, while Pauleta was included in the All-Star XI of the past 20 Years. The LFP announced the classification of training centers for the 2010–11 season. Paris Saint-Germain earned 417 points thanks largely to their double coronation as U-19 and U-17 French champions. The capital club appeared in the top ten, being ranked in ninth position just behind Lyon. Once again, Rennes occupied the top spot with a fairly consistent lead. The FFF announced the classification of professional youth clubs for the 2010–11 season. Paris Saint-Germain earned 421 points and was ranked the best professional youth club in recognition to their unprecedented and historic double.

Transfers
In

Total spending:  €9 million

Out

Total income:  €7 million

Squad information

Kit
Supplier: Nike / Sponsor: Fly Emirates

Kits information
Nike manufactured the kits for Paris Saint-Germain and Emirates Airlines continued to be the club's main sponsor. Nike have been PSG's official kit provider since 1989. Emirates have been a partner of the capital club since 2005 and the major shirt sponsor since January 2006. PSG were handed brand new home and away kits. The 2010–11 season marked PSG's 40th Anniversary and the shirt commemorated it by reverting to the club's original colours. The Stade Saint-Germain club played mainly in white until 1970, when they merged with Paris FC and combined the white of Saint-Germain-en-Laye with the red and blue colors of Paris. The new shirts presented a special badge commemorating PSG's 40th Anniversary. A golden embroidery encircled the shield with the traditional dates 1970 and 2010.

Home: The home kit was mainly solid red, the original colour of the club. Across the body there was a watermark that red 'PSG 1970'. The v-neck collar and the sleeves ends were navy.
Away: The away kit had PSG's traditional colors and included graphic details directly inspired by the architecture of the Parc des Princes. It featured a navy blue base with a red vertical band in the middle and two thinner white zigzagging stripes around the band that recalled the architecture of the stadium's roof. The shirt also featured a stylized red trimming around the sleeves ends, the bottom of the shirt and the v-neck collar. The chosen colors and their alternation (blue-white-red-white-blue) honored the club's original graphic codes and dropped Daniel Hechter's historical model. 
Third: The away kit from last season was retained as third kit for 2010–11 season.
Keeper: PSG goalkeepers wore three different kits throughout the season. The most conspicuous feature of the kits were the black zig-zags on the arms, based on the template Nike used in 2010 for its main clubs. The primary kit was purple, while the alternatives were pink and third were yellow.

Board and staff

Friendly matches
Paris Saint-Germain opened their pre-season campaign with a victory over Évian. It was Mathieu Bodmer's first match with Paris. Évian opened the score through Oumar Pouye, but second-half substitute Clément Chantôme saved the day for PSG with a double. "Les Parisiens" continued their preparations for the coming season in a match which saw new recruit Nenê made their debut for Antoine Kombouaré's side as PSG came from behind to record a victory over Portuguese side Sporting CP. Despite falling two goals behind in the first five minutes, with an own from goalkeeper Apoula Edel included, strikes from last season's top scorer Mevlüt Erdinç and Ludovic Giuly had the scores level at the break before Stéphane Sessègnon and Jean-Eudes Maurice scored in the second half to clinch a tough win. Three weeks before the start of the Ligue 1 season, pre-season preparations seemed to be progressing perfectly for PSG as they ran out convincingly winners against Belgian side Mechelen in an empty Camp des Loges, notching their third successive victory thanks to goals from Nenê, Christophe Jallet, Stéphane Sessègnon and Mevlüt Erdinç. Just a few days before the Trophée des Champions and the Tournoi de Paris, Antoine Kombouaré's men could only draw with Legia Warszawa in their last friendly match after being two up following consecutive goals from Guillaume Hoarau and Mateja Kežman. It seemed the hard work was done but the Polish outfit took advantage of PSG's overconfidence and managed to score twice in the final ten minutes.

After 17 years of absence, France's most prestigious tournament was back at the Parc des Princes. The Tournoi de Paris was first held in 1957 and the 2010 edition celebrated its 30th anniversary. Between 1975 and 1993, Paris Saint-Germain won the tournament a record seven times. It was abandoned by PSG's new shareholders Canal+ because of the club's financial deficit in 1993. The last champions were Paris Saint-Germain who defeated Auxerre in the 1993 edition final. The 2010 edition took place between 31 July and 1 August, with Italian side Roma, replacing Juventus, Portuguese club Porto and French outfit Girondins de Bordeaux visiting the Parc des Princes as PSG decided to resurrect the Tournoi de Paris for their 40th birthday. PSG presented their official anthem and mascot. The lyrics of "Go West" were rewritten following the suggestions made by the fans in PSG's website and was released as the official anthem before every match at the Parc des Princes. Germain, a lynx, was presented as the new mascot of PSG. After a draw between Bordeaux and Roma, Paris Saint-Germain defeated Porto in a match punctuated by the numerous chances created by both sides. The French capital won in extremis against the Portuguese thanks to a goal from Sammy Traoré at the end of regular time and took the first place in the standings.

Just like against Porto, "Les Parisiens" made the difference at the end of the encounter as Guillaume Hoarau equalized Roma's lead deep in stoppage time and allowed PSG to finish off their pre-season without having lost a single match. PSG's goal angered Roma's players who surrounded French referee Stéphane Lannoy. Roma coach Claudio Ranieri also walked onto the field to complain that too much injury time had been played when Hoarau scored. Earlier, Michaël Ciani scored off a free kick as Bordeaux came from behind against Porto to win the Tournoi de Paris with four points - the same total as PSG but "Les Girondins" scored one more goal. During the winter break, Paris Saint-Germain drew with Moroccan outfit Wydad Casablanca in Marrakech. Mouhcine Iajour put the home side ahead but Antoine Kombouaré's men were the dominant force throughout and got a deserved equalizer shortly before half-time when Mevlüt Erdinç headed home Tripy Makonda's cross.

Competitions

Trophée des Champions

French football began with reigning Ligue 1 and French Cup champions clashing in the 2010 Trophée des Champions, a competition that raised great expectations in Tunisia, where local fans bet on Hatem Ben Arfa's Olympique, of Tunisian origin. It was the 74th time Le Classique rivals Olympique de Marseille and Paris Saint-Germain played against each other and was the second match, the first being the 2006 French Cup Final, in the rivalry's history to be contested at neither the Stade Vélodrome nor the Parc des Princes. Marseille, backed by their League title and the League Cup, started as theoretical favourites, though their pre-season commitments had been very irregular, with victories over Vannes and Catania, but lost to AS Monaco and Toulouse, both French elite teams. The irregularity was accompanied by the absences of Mamadou Niang, Jordan Ayew, Brandão, Stéphane Mbia and Gabriel Heinze. PSG, meanwhile, finished their pre-season without having lost a single match, with their major concern being the absence through suspension of Guillaume Hoarau. "Les Phocéens" made their debut in the Trophée des Champions, although they won it once under the name "Challenge des Champions" in 1971. French Cup holders PSG, with two Supercups, were making their fifth appearance. Despite a lot of clear chances for both sides, the match went to penalties for the fourth time. From the spot, PSG had emerged victorious on a single occasion, back in 1996 thanks to a penalty miss from Claude Makélélé. Former PSG midfielder Édouard Cissé struck the winning penalty against his former club as Ligue 1 champions Marseille lifted the first trophy of the season, taking the shootout 5–4 in front of a new Champions Trophy record attendance of 57,000 as it finished goalless following 90 minutes. The shootout got off to the worst possible start for PSG as Peguy Luyindula hit the post and the ball rebounded off Steve Mandanda's head to safety. Though Lucho González's "Panenka" was easily saved by Grégory Coupet, Mandanda blocked Ludovic Giuly's sixth kick and Marseille won their fourth consecutive "Classico".

Ligue 1

New signing Nenê grabbed a goal on his Ligue 1 debut for Paris Saint-Germain as the club from the capital produced a commanding win over Saint-Étienne. PSG shaded the good chance count yet their game at Lille finished goalless. Bordeaux returned to winning ways with a thrilling victory against PSG at the Parc des Princes. First-half goals capped off a committed victory from Sochaux and cancelled out Guillaume Hoarau's strike early in the second half. Nenê produced a virtuoso performance with two goals as Paris Saint-Germain defeated Arles-Avignon. Honours were left even at the Parc des Princes as Paris Saint-Germain and Rennes failed to break the deadlock. An own goal from Lens captain Yohan Demont and a superb chipped strike from Nenê in injury time sent PSG to fifth place on the table. Paris Saint-Germain failed to make the breakthrough against Nice and it finished goalless at the Parc des Princes. Mevlüt Erdinç broke his two-month-long goal drought as Paris Saint-Germain stretched their unbeaten run to five league matches with a victory in Toulouse. Auxerre beat Paris Saint-Germain at the Parc des Princes despite Nenê's wondrous display crowned by two goals. Montpellier and Paris Saint-Germain could not be separated as Marco Estrada cancelled out Ludovic Giuly's opener. Mevlüt Erdinç and Guillaume Hoarau both found their scoring form in a sensational first 20 minutes to set Paris up for a win over Olympique de Marseille. Nenê pounced in the 90th to salvage a draw for PSG against Lorient.

Guillaume Hoarau and Mevlüt Erdinç were both on target as Paris Saint-Germain edged Caen at the Parc des Princes to continue their fine recent run of form. Bafétimbi Gomis pounced on an Apoula Edel error to salvage a point for Lyon against Paris Saint-Germain. Nenê's ninth Ligue 1 goal allowed Paris Saint-Germain to run out home winners over Brest and stand second in the table. Nenê took his tally to 11 Ligue 1 strikes as the Brazilian struck twice to keep Paris Saint-Germain in second place with a win at Valenciennes. PSG missed out on first place in Ligue 1 as Daniel Niculae levelled for AS Monaco two minutes from time. Paris Saint-Germain suffered only a second defeat in 23 competitive matches as Nancy registered an unexpected home win. PSG kept up the pressure on Lille at the top of the table with a narrow win over Sochaux at the Parc des Princes. Mevlüt Erdinç netted twice as Paris Saint-Germain survived a second-half fightback from Arles-Avignon to claim a win that kept the pressure on league leaders Lille. Rennes put a miserable last week behind them by edging PSG to get their title bid back on track. Paris Saint-Germain failed to find a way past Lens in a goalless draw at the Parc des Princes. PSG closed to within four points of leaders Lille with a comprehensive win at Nice. Paris Saint-Germain remained in title contention after a hard-fought victory over Toulouse at the Parc des Princes. Kamel Chafni produced a sumptuous strike to give Auxerre the win and dent PSG's title hopes.

Montpellier fought back from two goals down to secure a dramatic draw with PSG thanks to a brace from top scorer Olivier Giroud. Gabriel Heinze and André Ayew scored for Marseille to beat Paris Saint-Germain in the Clasico and climb to second in the table. Paris Saint-Germain extended their negative run after a scoreless home draw against Lorient. PSG returned to winning ways after a four-match winless run when they beat Caen thanks to goals from Christophe Jallet and Clément Chantôme. A freak Zoumana Camara goal was enough for Paris Saint-Germain to beat Lyon at the Parc des Princes to revive their Champions League ambitions. Paris Saint-Germain needed a late goal from Guillaume Hoarau to salvage a point at Brest and draw level with third-placed Lyon. Nenê notched his club-leading 14th Ligue 1 goal as Paris Saint-Germain enjoyed a home win over Valenciennes. Heroic goalkeeping from stand-in Sébastien Chabbert helped Monaco to claim an important point against Paris Saint-Germain at the Stade Louis II. PSG's Champions League hopes took a blow as they let their lead slip to draw with Nancy at the Parc des Princes. Paris Saint-Germain lost at Bordeaux to an early Cheick Diabaté penalty. Moussa Sow scored to help Lille earn the point they needed to be crowned Ligue 1 champions with a draw at Paris Saint-Germain. A Mathieu Bodmer penalty deep in second-half stoppage time earned Paris Saint-Germain a draw at Saint-Étienne as the club from the capital ended the season in fourth.

League table

Results summary

Results by round

Coupe de France 

Ligue 1 sides entered the draw for the last-64 of the French Cup and in a replay of the 2008 Coupe de la Ligue Final, defending champions Paris Saint-Germain hosted Lens at the Parc des Princes. Antoine Kombouaré's men ensured they kept their title defence alive with an impressive display against fellow Ligue 1 side Lens at the Parc des Princes. Zoumana Camara gave the hosts a half-time lead before further strikes from Nenê, Guillaume Hoarau and Peguy Luyindula sent Paris through. Paris Saint-Germain began their defence of the trophy by putting five past Lens, and then faced a trip to Aquitaine to play Agen of the fifth division, one of the smallest sides left in the tournament. Holders Paris Saint-Germain were made to work hard by Agen. Mathieu Bodmer had given the visitors the perfect start with an excellent angled shot but the sides turned around level as Daffé equalised. Peguy Luyindula, handed a rare start by Antoine Kombouaré, restored PSG's advantage after Guillaume Hoarau cleverly dummied a pass from Nenê. Seconds later, Hoarau headed in from a Nenê free-kick. Vandersnick reduced the final winning margin as Paris were still in contention to retain their crown and were also competing for honours in Ligue 1 and the Europa League. The seven Ligue 1 clubs left in the French Cup were all drawn against lower-level opposition. Holders Paris travelled south to play Martigues. Guillaume Hoarau's hat-trick gave French Cup holders Paris the victory in Martigues. Antoine Kombouaré's men stormed home in the second half against their ten-man opponents to secure a place in the quarter-finals. Paris Saint-Germain were drawn at home against Ligue 2 club Le Mans. Holders Paris Saint-Germain needed extra-time to see off Ligue 2 leaders Le Mans in the French Cup quarter-finals. Holders Paris Saint-Germain travelled to Angers in the last four of the French Cup after the draw was made. Paris Saint-Germain booked a place in the Final with a win in Angers, Brazilian winger Nenê rediscovering top form – with a goal and two assists – to set up a clash with Lille at the Stade de France on 14 May. Lille overcame their nerves – and a feisty Paris side – to claim their first French Cup in 56 years thanks to a wonder goal from substitute Ludovic Obraniak with just a minute left on the clock.

Coupe de la Ligue

The draw for the last 16 of the League Cup pitted Olympique Lyonnais playing host to Paris Saint-Germain as Ligue 1's European contenders entered into the competition after receiving byes for the earlier rounds. Paris left it late at the Stade de Gerland but, after extra-time, managed to overcome Lyon to book a place in the quarter-finals thanks to goals by former Lyon stars Mathieu Bodmer and Ludovic Giuly. Paris Saint-Germain were rewarded for their extra-time victory at Lyon with another away game, this time against Valenciennes. Antoine Kombouaré made several changes to the Paris side from the Clasico for the clash with his former club. Paris Saint-Germain held their nerve, though, and continued their excellent run by winning at the Stade Nungesser to seal their place in the League Cup semi-finals. Zoumana Camara, Christophe Jallet, and Peguy Luyindula all found the net as the capital club came from behind. Paris Saint-Germain were pitted against Montpellier again on the road. Having avoided a clash against arch-rivals Olympique de Marseille, PSG was looking for a quick return to the Stade de France after last season's French Cup triumph. An Olivier Giroud header three minutes from the end of extra-time took Montpellier into the League Cup Final at the expense of Paris Saint-Germain after a nervy evening at the Stade de la Mosson.

UEFA Europa League

Paris Saint-Germain faced Maccabi Tel Aviv for a place in the group stages of the Europa League after the play-off round draw at UEFA headquarters in Switzerland. PSG's French Cup triumph saw them stamp their ticket for a return to continental competition where they hosted the first leg at the Parc des Princes before heading to Israel for the return tie a week later. Paris Saint-Germain took the lead to Israel for the second leg of their play-off tie with Maccabi Tel Aviv. Peguy Luyindula and Guillaume Hoarau scored the PSG goals. Paris Saint-Germain lost at Maccabi Tel Aviv but still advanced to the group stage of the Europa League on aggregate. Paris Saint-Germain came up against former Champions League winners Borussia Dortmund and former UEFA Cup champions Sevilla in a testing Group J in which Ukrainian team Karpaty Lviv were the outsiders. Nenê pounced for the only goal of the game as PSG notched an upset win away to Sevilla. Paris Saint-Germain were in command of Group J after defeating Karpaty Lviv at the Parc des Princes. Paris Saint-Germain drew with Borussia Dortmund thanks to substitute Clément Chantôme's 87th-minute strike. Paris Saint-Germain were held to a goalless draw by Borussia Dortmund in an entertaining affair in the capital. Mathieu Bodmer, Nenê and Guillaume Hoarau did the damage for the capital club as they qualified for the last-32 after inflicting a second defeat on Sevilla to give a hint that PSG's glory days of Cup Winners' Cup and Intertoto triumphs could be on the way back.

Paris Saint-Germain were held to a draw in their final Europa League group game away to Karpaty Lviv but the result proved good enough for the Ligue 1 side to go through to the last-32 as group winners. PSG - who reached the last eight of the UEFA Cup in 2009 - faced Belarusian champions BATE Borisov in the last-32. If they came through that, then they had to meet either Portuguese champions Benfica or Bundesliga giants Stuttgart in the following round. PSG had Peguy Luyindula's last-gasp strike to thank for their strong perspective on the return leg. PSG were the only French club left in the Europa League after ten-man Lille crashed out with an aggregate loss to PSV in Eindhoven. PSG's aggregate win over BATE Borisov booked them a place in the last 16 against Benfica. Despite losing to Benfica in Lisbon, PSG took a lot of positives - and Peguy Luyindula's away goal - into the return leg of their Europa League tie at the Parc des Princes. After Marseille and Lyon, PSG became the third French side to crash out of Europe in as many days, their draw handing Benfica an aggregate win to progress to the Europa League quarter-finals.

Start formations

Starting XI

Appearances and goals

Other statistics
{| class="sortable" border="2" cellpadding="4" cellspacing="0" style="text-align:left; margin: 1em 1em 1em 0; background: #f9f9f9; border: 1px #aaa solid; border-collapse: collapse; font-size: 95%;"
|-
!class="sortable" width="50px"|No.
!width="50px"|Pos.
!class="sortable" width="50px"|Nat.
!width="150px"|Player
!class="sortable" width="50px"| Assists
!width="100px"|Minutes Played
!class="sortable" width="50px"|
!width="50px"|
|-
|1 || GK ||  || Grégory Coupet || 0 || 2104 || 0 || 0
|----
|16 || GK ||  || Alphonse Areola || 0 || 0 || 0 || 0
|----
|30 || GK ||  || Apoula Edel || 0 || 3296 || 0 || 0
|----
|2 || DF ||  || Ceará || 1 || 2532 || 2 || 0
|----
|3 || DF ||  || Mamadou Sakho || 1 || 4264 || 6 || 1
|----
|5 || DF ||  || Siaka Tiéné || 1 || 3548 || 15 || 0
|----
|6 || DF ||  || Zoumana Camara || 2 || 2999 || 6 || 1
|----
|13 || DF ||  || Sammy Traoré || 0 || 282 || 1 || 0
|----
|22 || DF ||  || Sylvain Armand || 1 || 3875 || 9 || 0
|----
|26 || DF ||  || Christophe Jallet || 2 || 4349 || 6 || 1
|----
|4 || MF ||  || Claude Makélélé || 1 || 3575 || 7 || 0
|----
|10 || MF ||  || Stéphane Sessègnon || 3 || 1271 || 2 || 0
|----
|12 || MF ||  || Mathieu Bodmer || 5 || 2695 || 6 || 0
|----
|19 || MF ||  || Nenê || 15 || 4372 || 7 || 0
|----
|20 || MF ||  || Clément Chantôme || 1 || 3645 || 16 || 1
|----
|23 || MF ||  || Jérémy Clément || 0 || 2384 || 6 || 1
|----
|24 || MF ||  || Tripy Makonda || 1 || 628 || 2 || 0
|----
|27 || MF ||  || Younousse Sankharé || 0 || 0 || 0 || 0
|----
|31 || MF ||  || Adama Touré || 0 || 0 || 0 || 0
|----
|34 || MF ||  || Loïck Landre || 0 || 60 || 0 || 0
|----
|35 || MF ||  || Florian Makhedjouf || 0 || 22 || 0 || 0
|----
|38 || MF ||  || Neeskens Kebano || 0 || 151 || 0 || 0
|----
|7 || FW ||  || Ludovic Giuly || 10 || 2945 || 5 || 0
|----
|8 || FW ||  || Peguy Luyindula || 4 || 2072 || 1 || 0
|----
|9 || FW ||  || Guillaume Hoarau || 8 || 3679 || 5 || 1
|----
|11 || FW ||  || Mevlüt Erdinç || 3 || 3462 || 2 || 0
|----
|14 || FW ||  || Mateja Kežman || 0 || 51 || 1 || 0
|----
|18 || FW ||  || Loris Arnaud || 0 || 0 || 0 || 0
|----
|21 || FW ||  || Jean-Eudes Maurice || 0 || 676 || 1 || 0
|----
|36 || FW ||  || Yacine Qasmi || 0 || 13 || 0 || 0
|----
|37 || FW ||  || Jean-Christophe Bahebeck || 0 || 268 || 0 || 0

Notes

References

External links

Official Websites
 PSG.fr
 Paris Saint-Germain at Ligue 1
 Paris Saint-Germain at UEFA

News Sites
 Paris Saint-Germain News from Le Parisien
 Paris Saint-Germain News from L'Equipe
 Paris Saint-Germain News from Sky Sports
 Paris Saint-Germain News from ESPN

2010-11
French football clubs 2010–11 season
2010–11 UEFA Europa League participants seasons